Edwin 'Ed' H. Bideau III (October 1, 1950 – September 5, 2013) was a lawyer, farmer, rancher, and Republican member of the Kansas House of Representatives, representing the 9th district (Neosho County, Kansas and Allen County, Kansas).

Bideau was a 5th generation Kansan who graduated from Chanute High School, Neosho County Community College, and then went on to get both a business and law degree from Washburn University in Topeka, Kansas, where he met and married his wife Margaret. They moved back to Chanute the day after Bideau passed the bar exam so he could serve as Assistant County Attorney for Neosho County. In 1976 he was elected County Attorney. In 1984 he was elected to the Kansas House of Representatives, representing the 5th district (Neosho County, Kansas). He chaired the House Reapportionment Committee and chaired a subcommittee that produced the very first Division of Assets bill to help protect elderly couples when nursing home care is required. He was named one of the top ten freshman legislators by Kansas Magazine his first year in office. Bideau left the legislature after two successful terms to help raise his children, but returned in 2012 to the Kansas House of Representatives, representing the 9th district (Neosho County, Kansas and Allen County, Kansas), after a landslide victory in the Republican primary and running unopposed in the general election. He served in this position until his death in September 2013.

References

External links
Office website
Business website
Official website
 Campaign website
Facebook
Open States
Vote Smart
Kanfocus
Capwiz Bio

1950 births
2013 deaths
People from Chanute, Kansas
Washburn University alumni
Kansas lawyers
Republican Party members of the Kansas House of Representatives
20th-century American lawyers
Neosho County Community College alumni
20th-century American politicians
21st-century American politicians